

Alpine skiing

2020 Winter Youth Olympics (FIS) and World Championships
 January 10 – 15: 2020 Winter Youth Olympics in  Les Diablerets
Boys' Super-G winners:   Adam Hofstedt;   Rok Ažnoh;    Luc Roduit;
Boys' Giant Slalom winners:   Philip Hoffmann;   Sandro Zurbrügg;   Luc Roduit;
Boys' Slalom:   Adam Hofstedt;   Luc Roduit;   Edoardo Saracco;
Boys' Combined:   Auguste Aulnette;   Mikkel Remsøy;   Adam Hofstedt;
Note: No silver medal was awarded here, due to a tie for first place, after all combined runs were completed.
Girls' Super-G:   Amélie Klopfenstein;   Caitlin McFarlane;   Noa Szollos;
Girls' Giant Slalom:   Amélie Klopfenstein;   Rosa Pohjolainen;   Amanda Salzgeber;
Girls' Slalom:   Emma Sahlin;   Lena Volken   Lara Klein;
Girls' combined:   Amanda Salzgeber;   Noa Szollos;   Amélie Klopfenstein;
Parallel Mixed Team winner:   Finland;   Germany;   Austria;
 March 5 – 14: World Junior Alpine Skiing Championships 2020 in  Narvik

2019–20 FIS Alpine Ski World Cup
 Note: For the FIS page about these events, click here.
October 2019
 October 26 & 27: ASWC #1 in  Sölden
 Giant Slalom winners:  Alexis Pinturault (m) /  Alice Robinson (f)

November 2019
 November 23 & 24: ASWC #2 in  Levi
 Slalom winners:  Henrik Kristoffersen (m) /  Mikaela Shiffrin (f)
 November 27 – December 1: ASWC #3 in  Lake Louise Ski Resort #1
 Men's Downhill winner:  Thomas Dreßen
 Men's Super Giant Slalom winner:  Matthias Mayer
 November 30 & December 1: ASWC #4 in  Killington
 Women's Giant Slalom winner:  Marta Bassino
 Women's Slalom winner:  Mikaela Shiffrin

December 2019
 December 3 – 8: ASWC #5 in  Lake Louise Ski Resort #2
 Women's Downhill winners:  Ester Ledecká (#1) /  Nicole Schmidhofer (#2)
 Women's Super Giant Slalom winner:  Viktoria Rebensburg
 December 3 – 8: ASWC #6 in  Beaver Creek Resort
 Men's Super Giant Slalom winner:  Marco Odermatt
 Men's Downhill winner:  Beat Feuz
 Men's Giant Slalom winner:  Tommy Ford
 December 14 & 15: ASWC #7 in  St. Moritz
 Women's Super G winner:  Sofia Goggia
 Women's Parallel Slalom winner:  Petra Vlhová
 December 14 & 15: ASWC #8 in  Val-d'Isère #1
 Men's Slalom winner:  Alexis Pinturault
 December 17: ASWC #9 in  Courchevel
 Women's Giant Slalom winner:  Federica Brignone
 December 18 – 21: ASWC #10 in  Val Gardena
 Men's Super G winner:  Vincent Kriechmayr
 December 19 – 22: ASWC #11 in  Val-d'Isère #2
 Here Alpine Combined and Downhill events was cancelled.
 December 22 & 23: ASWC #12 in  Alta Badia
 Men's Giant Slalom winner:  Henrik Kristoffersen
 Men's Parallel Giant Slalom winner:  Rasmus Windingstad
 December 26 – 29: ASWC #13 in  Bormio
 Downhill winners:  Dominik Paris (2 times)
 Alpine combined winner:  Alexis Pinturault
 December 28 & 29: ASWC #14 in  Lienz
 Women's Giant Slalom winner:  Mikaela Shiffrin
 Women's Slalom winner:  Mikaela Shiffrin

January 2020
 January 4 & 5: ASWC #15 in  Zagreb
 Slalom winners:  Clément Noël (m) /  Petra Vlhová (f)
 January 8: ASWC #16 in  Madonna di Campiglio
 Slalom winners:  Daniel Yule  
 January 9 – 12: ASWC #17 in  Altenmarkt-Zauchensee
 Downhill:  Corinne Suter  
 Alpine Combined:  Federica Brignone 
 January 11 & 12: ASWC #18 in  Adelboden
 Giant Slalom:  Žan Kranjec
 Slalom: Daniel Yule 
 January 14: ASWC #19 in  Flachau
 Slalom: Petra Vlhová 
 January 14 – 19: ASWC #20 in  Wengen
 January 18 & 19: ASWC #21 in  Sestriere
 January 21 – 26: ASWC #22 in  Kitzbühel
 January 23 – 26: ASWC #23 in  Bansko
 January 28: ASWC #24 in  Schladming
 January 29 – February 2: ASWC #25 in  Rosa Khutor Alpine Resort (will be relocated)
 January 30 – February 2: ASWC #26 in  Garmisch-Partenkirchen #1

February 2020
 February 6 – 9: ASWC #27 in  Garmisch-Partenkirchen #2
 February 8 & 9: ASWC #28 in  Chamonix
 February 12 – 16: ASWC #29 in  Yanqing District
 February 15 & 16: ASWC #30 in  Maribor
 February 20 – 23: ASWC #31 in  Crans-Montana
 February 22 & 23: ASWC #32 in  Yuzawa Naeba
 February 29 & March 1: ASWC #33 in  La Thuile
 February 29 & March 1: ASWC #34 in  Hinterstoder

March 2020
 March 5 – 8: ASWC #35 in  Kvitfjell
 March 7 & 8: ASWC #36 in  Ofterschwang
 March 12 – 14: ASWC #37 in  Åre ski resort
 March 14 & 15: ASWC #38 in  Kranjska Gora Ski Resort
 March 16 – 22: ASWC #39 (final) in  Cortina d'Ampezzo

2019–20 FIS Masters Cup
 January 3 – 5: MC #1 in  Cerkno
 Giant Slalom Winners: 
(30-34 y)  Christopher Jon Kaucic (m)
(35-39 y)  Andrea Zanei (m)
(40-44 y)  Doris Bergener (f),  Thomas Reisenbichler (m)
(45-49 y)  Bettina Digruber (f),  David Horacek (m)
(50-54 y)  Karin Maier (f),  Klaus Gstinig (m) 
(55-59 y)  Roberta Maria Persico (f),  Roberto Siorpaes (m) 
(60-64 y)  Boza Torkar (f),  Lorenzo Ferrari (m) 
(65-69 y)  Hermann Brandstaetter (m)
(70-74 y)  Markus Kerschbaumer (m)
(75-79 y)  Josef Kovak (m)
(80-84 y)  Leopold Gruber (m)
(85-99 y)  Gottfried Suppan (m)
 Slalom Winners:
(30-34 y)  Christopher Jon Kaucic(m)
(35-39 y)  Andrea Zanei (m)
(40-44 y)  Doris Bergener (f),  Tadej Prebil(m)
(45-49 y)  Mariia Titova (f),  Peter Furlan (m)
(50-54 y)  Karin Maier (f),  Klaus Gstinig (m) 
(55-59 y)  Ivana Ohlschlegelova (f),  Roberto Siorpaes (m) 
(60-64 y)  Brigitte Pirker (f),  Lorenzo Ferrari (m) 
(65-69 y)  Elisabeth Kabusch (f),  Hermann Brandstaetter (m)
(70-74 y)  Anna Fabretto (f),  Markus Kerschbaumer (m)
(75-79 y)  Leo Maerzendorfer (m)
(80-84 y)  Bruno Pachner (m)
(85-99 y)  Gottfried Suppan (m)
 January 10 – 11: MC #2 in  Reiteralm
 Giant Slalom Winners: 
(30-34 y)  Rene Pongritz (m)
(35-39 y)  Monika Gstoettinger (f),  Andrea Zanei (m)
(40-44 y)  Doris Bergener (f),  Thomas Reisenbichler (m)
(45-49 y)  Bettina Digruber (f),  Hansjoerg Spitaler (m)
(50-54 y)  Anita Gstrein (f),  Otto Unterkofler (m) 
(55-59 y)  Marianne Ascher (f),  Roberto Siorpaes (m) 
(60-64 y)  Hermine Lindner (f),  Josef Fuchs (m) 
(65-69 y)  Elisabeth Kabusch (f),  Harald Lipp (m)
(70-74 y)  Renate Abfalterer (f),  Pepi Neubauer (m)
(75-79 y)  Traudl Gilger (f),  Josef Kovar (m)
(80-84 y)  Leopold Gruber (m)
(85-99 y)  Gottfried Suppan (m)
 Super G Winners:
(30-34 y)  Rene Pongritz (m)
(35-39 y)  Monika Gstoettinger (f),  Stefan Mangard (m)
(40-44 y)  Doris Bergener (f),  Tadej Prebil(m)
(45-49 y)  Bettina Digruber (f),  Alfred Gruener (m)
(50-54 y)  Anita Gstrein (f),  Otto Unterkofler (m) 
(55-59 y)  Marianne Ascher (f),  Roberto Siorpaes (m) 
(60-64 y)  Hermine Lindner (f),  Josef Fuchs (m) 
(65-69 y)  Elisabeth Kabusch (f),  Harald Lipp (m)
(70-74 y)  Renate Abfalterer (f),  Markus Kerschbaumer (m)
(75-79 y)  Traudl Gilger (f),  Josef Kovar (m)
(80-84 y)  Leopold Gruber (m)
(85-99 y)  Gottfried Suppan (m)
 January 12 – 16: MC #3 in  Innsbruck
 Giant Slalom Winners: 
(30-34 y)  Rene Pongritz (m)
(35-39 y)  Cristina Caba (f),  Stefan Mangard (m)
(40-44 y)  Jasmina Dedic–Hagan (f),  Oskar Pramsohler (m)
(45-49 y)  Bettina Digruber (f),  Lukas Schranz (m)
(50-54 y)  Anita Gstrein (f),  Otto Unterkofler (m) 
(55-59 y)  Marianne Ascher (f),  Roberto Siorpaes (m) 
(60-64 y)  Muriel Jay (f),  Josef Fuchs (m) 
(65-69 y)  Julia Scharer (f),  Klaus Netzer (m)
(70-74 y)  Renate Abfalterer (f),  Pepi Neubauer (m)
(75-79 y)  Denyse Houde (f),  Michael Eberl (m)
(80-84 y)  Claudio Giovanardi (m)
(85-99 y)  Alberto Corsi (m)
 Slalom Winners:
(30-34 y)  Jun Leonhard Hauser (m)
(35-39 y)  Olga Landerer (f),  Jakub Gajewski-Glodek (m)
(40-44 y)  Simona Hoellermann (f),  Gian Mauro Piatoni(m)
(45-49 y)  Hanna Savolainen (f),  David Horacek (m)
(50-54 y)  Anita Gstrein (f),  Paul Bader (m) 
(55-59 y)  Monika Hoerhager (f),  Tor Helge Gauteplass (m) 
(60-64 y)  Muriel Jay (f),  Patrick Avenier (m) 
(65-69 y)  Julia Schaerer (f),  Michel Lerat (m)
(70-74 y)  Annelesse Kuder (f),  Eduard Reich (m)
(75-79 y)  Lilla Gidlow (f),  Achille Cattaneo (m)
(80-84 y)  Claudio Giovanardi (m)
(85-99 y)  Alberto Corsi (m)
 January 18 – 19: MC #4 in  Bischofswiesen – Götschen
 Cancelled.
 January 24 – 26: MC #5 in  Zagreb – Sljeme
 January 31 – February 2: MC #6  in  Châtel

2019–2020 FIS Alpine Skiing European Cup

November 2019
 November 29 & 30: ECAS #1 in  Funäsdalen #1
Slalom Winner:  Sara Rask
 November 29 & 30: ECAS #2 in  Trysil #1
Slalom Winner:  Linus Strasser

December 2019
 December 2 & 3: ECAS #3 in  Funäsdalen #2 
Giant Slalom Winner:  Fabian Wilkens Solheim
 December 2 & 3: ECAS #4 in   Trysil #2
Slalom Winner:  Jessica Hilzinger
 December 5 & 6: ECAS #5 in  Kvitfjell
Super G Winner:  Nadine Fest
Alpine Combined Winner:  Nadine Fest
 December 9 & 10: ECAS #6 in  Santa Caterina
Super G Winner:  Ralph Weber
Alpine Combined Winner:  Robin Buffet
 December 10 & 11: ECAS #7 in  St. Moritz
Super G Winner:  Ida Dannewitz
 December 12: ECAS #8 in  Zinal
Super G Winner:  Alexandre Prast
 December 14 & 15: ECAS #9 in  Andalo
Giant Slalom Winner:  Marte Monsen
 December 16: ECAS #10 in  Val di Fassa
Slalom Winner:  Tommaso Sala
 December 21: ECAS #11 in  Kronplatz
Slalom Winner:  Charlotte Chable (f),  Marco Reymond (m)
Parallel Slalom Winner:  Emelie Henning (f),  Pirmin Hacker (m)

January 2020
 January 5 & 6: ECAS #12 in  Vaujany
Slalom Winner:  Anton Tremmel
 January 8 – 11: ECAS #13 in  Wengen
Downhill Winner:  Stefan Rogentin
 January 17 & 18: ECAS #14 in  Zell am See
 January 18 & 19: ECAS #15 in  Kirchberg
 January 19 – 22: ECAS #16 in  St. Anton
 January 22 – 26: ECAS #17 in  Orcieres
 January 23 & 24: ECAS #18 in  Hasliberg
 January 28 & 29: ECAS #19 in  Meribel
 January 29 & 30: ECAS #20 in  Morzine
 January 31 & February 1: ECAS #21 in  Jaun

February 2020
 February 3 – 5: ECAS #22 in  Pila
 February 3 – 6: ECAS #23 in  Saalbach
 February 8 – 10: ECAS #24 in  Berchtesgaden
 February 12 – 14: ECAS #25 in  Sella Nevea
 February 12 – 16: ECAS #26 in  Crans-Montana
 February 19 – 21: ECAS #27 in  Sarntal
 February 20 & 21: ECAS #28 in  Jasná
 February 26 & 27: ECAS #29 in  Krvavec
 February 27 – March 1: ECAS #30 in  Kvitfjell
 February 29 – March 1: ECAS #31 in  Bad Wiessee

March 2020
 March 18: ECAS #32 in  Saalbach
 March 20 – 22: ECAS #33 in  Reiteralm

2019–20 FIS Alpine Skiing European Cup
 Note: For the FIS page about these events, click here.
 November 2019
 November 29 & 30: ECAS #1 in  Trysil
 Men's Slalom winners:  Linus Straßer (#1) /  Tommaso Sala (#2)
 November 29 & 30: ECAS #2 in  Funäsdalen #1
 Women's Giant Slalom winners:  Sara Rask ((2 times) 
 December 2019
 December 2 & 3: ECAS #3 in  Funäsdalen #2
 Women's Slalom winners:  Jessica Hilzinger (2 times)
 December 2 & 3: ECAS #4 in  Trysil #2
 Men's Giant Slalom winners:  Fabian Wilkens Solheim (2 times)
 December 5 & 6: ECAS #5 in  Kvitfjell #1
 Women's Super G winner:  Nadine Fest
 Women's Alpine Combined winner:  Nadine Fest
 December 9 & 10: ECAS #6 in  Santa Caterina di Valfurva
 Men's Alpine Combined winner:  Robin Buffet
 Men's Super G winner:  Ralph Weber
 December 10 & 11: ECAS #7 in  St. Moritz
 Women's Super G winners:  Ida Dannewitz (#1) /  Tessa Worley (#2)
 December 12 & 13: ECAS #8 in  Zinal
 Men's Super G winners:  Niklas Köck (#1) /  Alexander Prast (#2)
 December 14 & 15: ECAS #9 in  Andalo
 Women's Giant Slalom winners:  Marte Monsen (#1) /  Elisa Mörzinger (#2)
 December 16: ECAS #10 in  Fassa Valley #1
 Men's Slalom winner:  Tommaso Sala
 December 17 – 20: ECAS #11 in  Fassa Valley #2
 Cancelled.
 December 18: ECAS #12 in  Obereggen
 Cancelled.
 December 21: ECAS #13 in  Kronplatz
 Parallel Slalom winners:  Pirmin Hacker (m) /  Emelie Henning (f)
 January 2020
 January 5 & 6: ECAS #14 in  Vaujany
 Men's Slalom winners:  Anton Tremmel (#1) /  Federico Liberatore (#2)
 January 8 – 11: ECAS #15 in  Wengen
 Men's Downhill winners:  Stefan Rogentin (#1) /  Davide Cazzaniga (#2)
 January 17 & 18: ECAS #16 in  Zell am See
 January 18 & 19: ECAS #17 in  Kirchberg in Tirol
 January 19 – 22: ECAS #18 in  St Anton am Arlberg
 January 22 – 26: ECAS #19 in  Orcières
 January 23 & 24: ECAS #20 in  Melchsee-Frutt
 January 28 & 29: ECAS #21 in  Méribel
 January 29 & 30: ECAS #22 in  Morzine
 January 31 & February 1: ECAS #23 in  Jaun
 February 2020
 February 3 – 6: ECAS #24 in  Saalbach-Hinterglemm
 February 8 & 9: ECAS #26 in  Berchtesgaden
 February 12 – 14: ECAS #27 in  Sella Nevea
 February 13 – 16: ECAS #28 in  Crans-Montana
 February 19 & 20: ECAS #29 in  Sarntal
 February 20 & 21: ECAS #30 in  Jasná
 February 26 & 27: ECAS #31 in  Krvavec Ski Resort
 February 27 – March 1: ECAS #32 in  Kvitfjell #2
 February 29 & March 1: ECAS #33 in  Bad Wiessee
 March 2020
 March 20 – 22: ECAS #35 (final) in  Reiteralm

2019–20 FIS Alpine Skiing Nor-Am Cup
 Note: For the FIS page about these events, click here.
 November 19 – 22, 2019: SNAC #1 in  Copper Mountain
 Men's Slalom winners:  AJ Ginnis (#1) /  Asher Jordan (#2)
 Women's Slalom winners:  Lila Lapanja (2 times) 
 December 9 – 13, 2019: SNAC #2 in  Lake Louise Ski Resort
 Men's Downhill winners:  Jeffrey Read (#1) /  Cameron Alexander
 Women's Downhill winners:  Keely Cashman (#1) /  Alix Wilkinson (#2)
 Super G winners:  James Crawford (m) /  Keely Cashman (f)
 December 16 – 20, 2019: SNAC #3 in  Nakiska
 Alpine Combined winners:  Jeffrey Read (m) /  Keely Cashman (f)
 Super G winners:  Jeffrey Read (m) /  Isabella Wright (f)
 Men's Giant Slalom winners:  Maarten Meiners (#1) / 2nd is cancelled
 Women's Giant Slalom winners:  Foreste Peterson (#1) / 2nd is cancelled
 Men's Slalom winners:  Jeffrey Read (#1) /  Ben Ritchie (#2)
 Women's Slalom winners:  Amelia Smart (#1) /  Katie Hensien (#2)
 January 2 – 5: SNAC #4 in  Burke Mountain Ski Area
 Women's Giant Slalom winner:  Adriana Jelnikova (2 times)
 Women's Slalom winner:  Nina O'Brien
 Men's Giant Slalom winner:  Bastian Meisen
 January 6 – 8: SNAC #5 in  Stowe Mountain Resort
 Men's Giant Slalom winners:  Bastian Meisen (#1) /  Brodie Seger (#2)
 Men's Slalom winner:  Benjamin Ritchie
 February 3 – 7: SNAC #6 in  Mont-Édouard
 February 4 & 5: SNAC #7 in  Georgian Peaks Club
 February 6 & 7: SNAC #8 in  Osler Bluff Ski Club
 February 8: SNAC #9 in  Craigleith Ski Club
 February 10 – 13: SNAC #10 in  Whiteface Mountain
 February 14: SNAC #11 in  National Winter Activity Center
 March 17 – 24: SNAC #12 (final) in  Panorama Mountain Village

2019–20 FIS Alpine Skiing Far East Cup
 Note: For the FIS page about these events, click here.
 December 4 – 7, 2019: FEC #1 in  Wanlong Ski Resorts (Chongli District)
 Men's Slalom winners:  Jung Dong-hyun (#1) /  William Hansson (#2)
 Women's Slalom winners:  Piera Hudson (#1) /  Martina Dubovská (#2)
 Men's Giant Slalom winners:  William Hansson (2 times) 
 Women's Giant Slalom winners:  Piera Hudson #1) /  Asa Ando (#2)
 December 10 & 11, 2019: FEC #2 in  Thaiwoo Ski Resort (Chongli District)
 Men's Giant Slalom winners:  Jung Dong-hyun (#1) /  Alexey Zhilin (#2)
 Women's Giant Slalom winners:  Hilma Loevblom (#1) /  Piera Hudson (#2)
 February 6 & 7: FEC #3 in  Yongpyong Resort
 February 11 – 14: FEC #4 in  Bears Town Resort
 February 29 – March 2: FEC #5 in  Engaru
 March 5 & 6: FEC #6 in  Akan
 March 19 – 26: FEC #7 (final) in  Yuzhno-Sakhalinsk

2019 FIS Alpine Skiing Australia & New Zealand Cup
 Note: For the FIS page about these events, click here.
 August 19 – 23: A&NZ #1 in  Hotham Alpine Resort
 Note: The men's slalom event was cancelled.
 Women's Slalom winners:  Piera Hudson (#1) /  Josephine Forni (#2)
 Giant Slalom winners:  Magnus Walch (m) /  Storm Klomhaus (f)
 August 26 – September 2: A&NZ #2 in  Coronet Peak
 Men's Super G winners:  Armand Marchant (#1) /  Maarten Meiners (#2)
 Women's Super G winner:  Alice Robinson (2 times)
 Men's Giant Slalom winners:  Sam Maes (#1) /  Marco Reymond (#2)
 Women's Giant Slalom winners:  Storm Klomhaus (#1) /  Chiara Mair (#2)
 Men's Slalom winners:  Marc Rochat (#1) /  Fabio Gstrein (#2)
 Women's Slalom winner:  Alexandra Tilley (2 times)
 September 4 & 5: A&NZ #3 (final) in  Cardrona Alpine Resort
 Giant Slalom winners:  Magnus Walch (m) /  Piera Hudson (f)
 Men's Slalom winner:  Sebastian Foss-Solevåg

2019 FIS Alpine Skiing South American Cup
 Note: For the FIS page about these events, click here.
 August 5 – 8: SAC #1 in  Cerro Catedral
 Giant Slalom winners:  Alejandro Puente Tasias (m) /  Mialitiana Clerc (f)
 Slalom winners:  Juan del Campo (m) /  Mialitiana Clerc (f)
 August 10 – 13: SAC #2 in  El Bolsón
 Slalom winners:  Juan del Campo (m) /  Mialitiana Clerc (f)
 August 15 & 16: SAC #3 in  Chapelco
 Giant Slalom winners:  Alejandro Puente Tasias (m) /  Elena Yakovishina (f)
 September 9 – 12: SAC #4 in  El Colorado
 Event cancelled.
 September 16 – 20: SAC #5 in  Cerro Castor
 Slalom winners:  Robin Buffet (m) /  Doriane Escane (f)
 Giant Slalom winners:  Thibaut Favrot (m) /  Lindy Etzensperger (f)
 September 23 – 28: SAC #6 in  Antillanca
 Note: The Super G events were cancelled.
 Giant Slalom winners:  Andres Figueroa (m) /  Sarah Schleper (f)
 Slalom winners:  Lars Kuonen (m) /  Macarena Simari Birkner (f)
 October 2 – 6: SAC #7 (final) in  Corralco
 Men's Downhill winners:  Henrik von Appen (#1) /  Cristian Javier Simari Birkner (#2 & #3)
 Women's Downhill winner:  Elena Yakovishina (3 times)
 Men's Alpine Combined winners:  Cristian Javier Simari Birkner (#1) /  Henrik von Appen (#2)
 Women's Alpine Combined winner:  Elena Yakovishina (2 times)
 Men's Super G winner:  Henrik von Appen (3 times)
 Women's Super G winner:  Elena Yakovishina (3 times)

2019 FIS Grass skiing Events

World Grass Skiing Championships
 July 30 – August 4: 2019 World Junior Grass Skiing Championships in  Štítná nad Vláří-Popov
 Giant Slalom winners:  Martin Bartak (m) /  Chisaki Maeda (f)
 Super G winners:  Martin Bartak (m) /  Chisaki Maeda (f)
 Super Combined winners:  Filip Machu (m) /  Chisaki Maeda (f)
 Slalom winners:  Jan Borak (m) /  Chisaki Maeda (f)
 August 13 – 18: 2019 World Grass Skiing Championships in  Marbachegg
 Super Combined winners:  Edoardo Frau (m) /  Chisaki Maeda (f)
 Giant Slalom winners:  Stefan Portmann (m) /  Chisaki Maeda (f)
 Slalom winners:  Mirko Hueppi (m) /  Chisaki Maeda (f)
 Super G winners:  Edoardo Frau (m) /  Chisaki Maeda (f)

2019 FIS Grass Skiing World Cup
 Note: For the FIS page about these events, click here.
 June 15 & 16: GSWC #1 in  Rettenbach
 Giant Slalom winners:  Martin Bartak (m) /  Jacqueline Gerlach (f)
 Super Combined winners:  Edoardo Frau (m) /  Jacqueline Gerlach (f)
 Super G winners:  Martin Bartak (m) /  Adela Kettnerova (f)
 June 29 & 30: GSWC #2 in  Předklášteří
 Men's Giant Slalom winner:  Martin Bartak (2 times)
 Women's Giant Slalom winner:  Jacqueline Gerlach (2 times)
 July 6 & 7: GSWC #3 in  Cortina d'Ampezzo
 Men's Slalom winner:  Lorenzo Dante Marco Gritti (2 times)
 Women's Slalom winners:  Jacqueline Gerlach (#1) /  Alena Vesela (#2)
 August 25 – 27: GSWC #4 in  Dizin
 Giant Slalom winners:  Martin Bartak (m) /  Jacqueline Gerlach (f)
 Super G winners:  Martin Bartak (m) /  Jacqueline Gerlach (f)
 Super Combined winners:  Edoardo Frau (m) /  Jacqueline Gerlach (f)
 Slalom winners:  Lorenzo Dante Marco Gritti (m) /  Jacqueline Gerlach (f)
 September 12 – 15: GSWC #5 (final) in  Schilpario
 Super Combined winners:  Martin Bartak (m) /  Jacqueline Gerlach (f)
 Slalom winners:  Mirko Hueppi (m) /  Jacqueline Gerlach (f)
 Giant Slalom winners:  Stefan Portmann (m) /  Jacqueline Gerlach (f)
 Super G winners:  Mattia Arrigoni (m) /  Jacqueline Gerlach (f)

2019 FIS Grass Skiing Junior Cup
 Note: For the FIS page about these events, click here.
 May 25 & 26: GSJC #1 in  Piešťany
 Men's Slalom winner:  Martin Bartak (2 times)
 Women's Slalom winner:  Sarka Abrahamova (2 times)
 May 31 – June 2: GSJC #2 in  Marbachegg
 Note: The Super Combined & the Super G events here was cancelled.
 Slalom winners:  Nicolo Schiavetti (m) /  Vanesa Drahovska (f)
 Giant Slalom winners:  Martin Bartak (m) /  Sarka Abrahamova (f)
 June 21 – 23: GSJC #3 in  Schwarzenbach-Sankt Veit an der Gölsen
 Super Combined winners:  Martin Bartak (m) /  Julia Jaehnigen (f)
 Super G winners:  Martin Bartak (m) /  Alena Vesela (f)
 Giant Slalom winners:  Martin Bartak (m) /  Alena Vesela (f)
 Slalom winners:  Martin Bartak (m) /  Nikola Fricova (f)
 August 22 – 24: GSJC #4 (final) in  Dizin
 Giant Slalom winners:  Nicolo Schiavetti (m) / (f)
 Slalom winners:  Filippo Zamboni (m) / (f)
 Super Combined winners:  Filippo Zamboni (m) / (f)
 Super G winners:  Filippo Zamboni (m) /  Sarka Abrahamova (f)

Biathlon

International biathlon championships and Winter Youth Olympics
 January 11 – 15: Biathlon at the 2020 Winter Youth Olympics in  Prémanon
Boys' Events
 Sprint winner:   Marcin Zawół;   Denis Irodov;   Vegard Thon;
 Individual winner:   Oleg Domichek   Lucas Haslinger;   Mathieu Garcia;
Girls'Events
 Sprint:   Alena Mokhova   Anastasiia Zenova;   Anna Andexer;
 Individual:   Alena Mokhova   Jeanne Richard;   Yuliya Kavaleuskaya;
Mixed Events
Single mixed relay:   France;   Italy;   Sweden;
Mixed relay:   Italy;   Russia;   France;
 August 21 – 25, 2019: 2019 IBU Summer Biathlon World Championships in  Minsk-Raubichi
 Men's 20 km Individual winner:  Krasimir Anev
 Women's 15 km Individual winner:  Hanna Öberg
 Pursuit #1 winners:  Tarjei Bø (m) /  Ekaterina Yurlova-Percht (f)
 Pursuit #2 winners:  Martin Otčenáš (m) /  Zhang Yan
 Sprint #1 winners:  Tarjei Bø (m) /  Mona Brorsson (f)
 Sprint #2 winners:  Timofey Lapshin (m) /  Ekaterina Glazyrina &  Lucie Charvátová (f)
 Super-Sprint winners:  Timofey Lapshin (m) /  Valentyna Semerenko (f)
 Juniors Sprint winners:  Dzmitry Lazouski (m) /  Yuanmeng Chu (f)
 Juniors Pursuit winners:  Dzmitry Lazouski (m) /  Yuanmeng Chu (f)
 Juniors Super-Sprint winners:  Mikita Labastau (m) /  Valeriia Vasnetcova (f)
 January 27 – February 2: 2020 IBU Youth/Junior World Championships in  Lenzerheide
 February 12 – 23: Biathlon World Championships 2020 in  Antholz-Anterselva
 February 24 – March 1: 2020 IBU Open European Championships in  Otepää
 March 9 – 15: 2020 IBU Junior Open European Championships in  Hochfilzen

2019–20 Biathlon World Cup
 November 29 – December 8, 2019: BWC #1 in  Östersund
 Men's 10 km Sprint winner:  Johannes Thingnes Bø
 Women's 7.5 km Sprint winner:  Dorothea Wierer
 Men's 20 km Individual winner:  Martin Fourcade
 Women's 15 km Individual winner:  Justine Braisaz
 December 12 – 15, 2019: BWC #2 in  Hochfilzen
 Men's 10 km Sprint winner:  Johannes Thingnes Bø
 Women's 7.5 km Sprint winner:  Dorothea Wierer
 Men's 12.5 km Pursuit winner:  Johannes Thingnes Bø
 Women's 10 km Pursuit winner:  Tiril Eckhoff
 December 16 – 22, 2019: BWC #3 in  Annecy-Le Grand-Bornand
 Men's 10 km Sprint winner:  Benedikt Doll
 Women 7.5 km Sprint winner:  Tiril Eckhoff
 Men's 12.5 km Pursuit winner:  Johannes Thingnes Bø
 Women's 10 km Pursuit winner:  Tiril Eckhoff
 Men's 15 km Mass Start winner:  Johannes Thingnes Bø
 Women's 12.5 km Mass Start winner:  Tiril Eckhoff
 January 6 – 12: BWC #4 in  Oberhof
 Women 7.5 km Sprint winner:  Marte Olsbu Røiseland
 Men's 10 km Sprint winner:  Martin Fourcade
 Women's 12.5 km Mass Start winner:  Kaisa Mäkäräinen
 Men's 15 km Mass Start winner:  Martin Fourcade
 January 13 – 19: BWC #5 in  Ruhpolding
 January 20 – 26: BWC #6 in  Pokljuka
 March 2 – 8: BWC #7 in  Nové Město na Moravě
 March 9 – 15: BWC #8 in  Kontiolahti
 March 16 – 22: BWC #9 (final) in  Oslo-Holmenkollen

2019–20 IBU Cup
 November 25 – December 1, 2019: IBU Cup #1 in  Sjusjøen
 Men's 10 km Sprint winners:  Lucas Fratzscher (#1) /  Fredrik Gjesbakk (#2)
 Women's 7.5 km Sprint winners:  Karoline Erdal (#1) /  Irina Starykh (#2)
 Pursuit winners:  Philipp Nawrath (m) /  Elisabeth Högberg (f)
 December 9 – 15, 2019: IBU Cup #2 in  Ridnaun-Val Ridanna
 Super-Sprint winners:  Lars Helge Birkeland (m) /  Ingela Andersson (f)
 Sprint winners:  Maksim Varabei (m) /  Johanna Skottheim (f)
 Mass Start winners:  Lars Helge Birkeland (m) /  Anastasiia Porshneva (f)
 December 16 – 21, 2019: IBU Cup #3 in  Obertilliach
 Men's 15 km Individual winner:  Serhiy Semenov
 Women's 12.5 km Individual winner:  Stefanie Scherer
 Sprint winners:  Aleksander Fjeld Andersen (m) /  Johanna Skottheim (f)
 Single Mixed Relay winners:  (Stefanie Scherer & Lucas Fratzscher)
 January 6 – 12: IBU Cup #4 in  Osrblie
 Women's 12.5 km Individual winner:  Ekaterina Glazyrina
 Men's 15 km Individual winner:  Endre Strømsheim
 Women's 7.5 km Sprint winner:  Evgeniya Pavlova
 Men's 10 km Sprint winner:  Philipp Nawrath
 January 13 – 18: IBU Cup #5 in  Duszniki-Zdrój
 February 3 – 9: IBU Cup #6 in  Arber
 February 10 – 15: IBU Cup #7 in  Martell-Val Martello
 March 2 – 8: IBU Cup #8 (final) in  Minsk-Raubichi

2019–20 IBU Junior Cup
 December 9 – 15, 2019: IBUJC #1 in  Pokljuka
 Men's 15 km Individual winner:  Niklas Hartweg
 Women's 12.5 km Individual winner:  Lisa Maria Spark
 Men's 10 km Sprint winner:  Didier Bionaz
 Women's 7.5 km Sprint winner:  Amy Baserga
 Single Mixed Relay winners:  (Paula Botet & Sebastien Mahon)
 4x6 Mixed Relay winners:  (Lea Meier, Amy Baserga, Laurin Fravi, Niklas Hartweg)
 December 16 – 21, 2019: IBUJC #2 in  Martell-Val Martello
 Men's 12.5 km Pursuit winner:  Tommaso Giacomel
 Women's 10 km Pursuit winner:  Amy Baserga
 Men's 10 km Sprint winner:  Niklas Hartweg
 Women's 7.5 km Sprint winner:  Daria Gembicka
 Single Mixed Relay winners:  (Niklas Hartweg & Lea Meier)
 4x7.5 Mixed Relay winners:  (Sebastien Mahon, Guillaume Desmus, Laura Boucaud, Paula Botet)
 March 2 – 8: IBUJC #3 (final) in  Arber

Cross-country skiing

International cross-country events and Winter Youth Olympics
 January 18 – 22: Cross-country skiing at the 2020 Winter Youth Olympics in  Le Brassus
 February 28 – March 8: Part of the 2020 Nordic Junior World Ski Championships in  Oberwiesenthal

2019–20 FIS Cross-Country World Cup
 Note: For the FIS page about these events, click here.
 November 29 – December 1, 2019: CCWC #1 in  Ruka
 Men's overall standing winner:  Johannes Høsflot Klæbo
 Women's overall standing winner:  Therese Johaug
 December 7 & 8, 2019: CCWC #2 in  Lillehammer
 Skiathlon winners:  Alexander Bolshunov (m) /  Therese Johaug (f)
 Relay 4x5 km winners:  (Ivan Yakimushkin, Evgeniy Belov, Ilia Poroshkin, Sergey Ustiugov) (m) /  (Maiken Caspersen Falla, Astrid Uhrenholdt Jacobsen, Therese Johaug, Heidi Weng) (f)
 December 14 & 15, 2019: CCWC #3 in  Davos
 Men's 15 km Freestyle winner:  Simen Hegstad Krüger
 Women's 10 km Freestyle winner:  Therese Johaug
 Sprint Freestyle winners:  Johannes Høsflot Klæbo (m) /  Linn Svahn (f)
 December 21 & 22, 2019: CCWC #4 in  Planica
 Sprint Freestyle winners:  Lucas Chanavat (m) /  Jonna Sundling (f)
 Team Sprint winners:  (Sindre Bjørnestad Skar & Erik Valnes) (m) /  (Maja Dahlqvist & Linn Svahn) (f)
 December 28, 2019 – January 5: CCWC #5 in  Lenzerheide,  Toblach and  Fiemme Valley
 Men's overall standing winner:  Alexander Bolshunov
 Women's overall standing winner:  Therese Johaug
 January 11 & 12: CCWC #6 in  Dresden
 Sprint Freestyle winners:  Lucas Chanavat (m) /  Linn Svahn (f)
 Team Sprint winners:  (Renaud Jay & Lucas Chanavat) (m) /  (Maja Dahlqvist & Linn Svahn) (f)
 January 18 & 19: CCWC #7 in  Nové Město na Moravě
 January 25 & 26: CCWC #8 in  Oberstdorf
 February 8 & 9: CCWC #9 in  Falun
 February 15 – 25: CCWC #10 in  Östersund,  Åre,  Meråker and Trondheim
 February 29 & March 1: CCWC #11 in  Lahti
 March 4: CCWC #12 in  Drammen
 March 7 & 8: CCWC #13 in  Oslo
 March 14 – 17: CCWC #14 in  Quebec City and  Minneapolis
 March 20 – 22: CCWC #15 (final) in  Canmore

2019–20 FIS Cross-Country Skiing Alpen Cup
 Note: For the FIS page about these events, click here.
 December 7 & 8, 2019: CCSAC #1 in  Pokljuka
 Men's 1.5 Sprint Freestyle winner:  Michael Hellweger
 Women's 1.2 Sprint Freestyle winner:  Katja Višnar
 Men's 15 km Freestyle winner:  Hugo Lapalus
 Women's 10 km Freestyle winner:  Elisa Brocard
 December 19 – 21, 2019: CCSAC #2 in  Sankt Ulrich am Pillersee
 1.1 km Sprint Freestyle winners:  Jules Chappaz (m) /  Coletta Rydzek (f)
 Men's 15 km Classic winner:  Dietmar Nöckler
 Women's 10 km Classic winner:  Ilaria Debertolis
 10 km Freestyle winners:  Jules Chappaz (m) /  Petra Nováková (f)
 January 4 & 5: CCSAC #3 in  Campra
 January 18 & 19: CCSAC #4 in  Pragelato
 February 7 – 9: CCSAC #5 in  Piancavallo-Aviano
 March 20 – 22: CCSAC #6 (final) in  Zwiesel

2019–20 FIS Cross-Country Skiing Eastern Europe Cup
 Note: For the FIS page about these events, click here.
 November 12 – 14, 2019: EEC #1 in  Shchuchinsk
 1.5 km Classic winners:  Andrey Parfenov (m) /  Anastasia Kirillova (f)
 Men's 10 km Classic winner:  Ermil Vokuev
 Women's 5 km Classic winner:  Anastasia Kirillova
 Men's 10 km Freestyle winner:  Vitaliy Pukhkalo
 Women's 5 km Freestyle winner:  Ekaterina Smirnova
 November 29 – December 3, 2019: EEC #2 in  Vershina Tea
 1.5 km Classic winners:  Sergey Ardashev (m) /  Yevgeniya Shapovalova (f)
 Men's 15 km Freestyle winner:  Alexey Vitsenko
 Women's 10 km Freestyle winner:  Alena Perevozchikova
 1.5 km Freestyle winners:  Andrey Krasnov (m) /  Hristina Matsokina (f)
 Men's 15 km Classic winner:  Ivan Kirillov
 Women's 10 km Classic winner:  Yevgeniya Shapovalova
 December 25 – 29, 2019: EEC #3 in  Krasnogorsk #1
 Event cancelled.
 January 16 – 19: EEC #4 in  Minsk-Raubichi
 February 7 – 9: EEC #5 in  Krasnogorsk #2
 February 23: EEC #6 in  Moscow
 February 26 – March 1: EEC #7 (final) in  Kononovskaya

2019–20 FIS Cross-Country Skiing US Super Tour
 Note: For the FIS page about these events, click here.
 December 14 & 15, 2019: UST #1 in  Lake Creek Nordic Center
 1.2 km Classic winners:  Tyler Kornfield (m) /  Katharine Ogden
 Men's 15 km Freestyle winner:  Ian Torchia
 Women's 10 km Freestyle winner:  Riitta-Liisa Roponen
 January 24 – 26: UST #2 in  Craftsbury Outdoor Center
 February 16 & 17: UST #3 in  Theodore Wirth Park (Minneapolis)
 February 19 – 22: UST #4 (final) in  Cable-Hayward

2019–20 FIS Cross-Country Skiing Nor-Am Cup
 Note: For the FIS page about these events, click here.
 December 6 – 8, 2019: SNAC #1 in  Canmore Nordic Centre Provincial Park
 1.3 km Freestyle winners:  Jesse Cockney (m) /  Julia Richter (f)
 Men's 10 km Classic winner:  Zak Ketterson
 Women's 5 km Classic winner:  Katharine Ogden
 Men's 15 km Freestyle winner:  Benjamin Lustgarten
 Women's 10 km Freestyle winner:  Caitlin Compton Gregg
 December 13 – 15, 2019: SNAC #2 in  Nakkertok Nordic Ski Centre
 Men's 1.4 Sprint Classic winner:  Bob Thompson
 Women's 1.3 Sprint Classic winner:  Katherine Stewart-Jones
 Men's 10 km Freestyle winner:  Antoine Cyr
 Women's 5 km Freestyle winner:  Katherine Stewart-Jones
 Men's 10 km Classic winner:  Evan Palmer-Charrette
 Women's 10 km Classic winner:  Katherine Stewart-Jones
 January 30 – February 2: SNAC #3 (final) in  Mont-Sainte-Anne

2019–20 FIS Cross-Country Skiing Slavic Cup
 Note: For the FIS page about these events, click here.
 December 7 & 8, 2019: SSC #1 in  Štrbské Pleso #1
 Cancelled.
 December 14 & 15, 2019: SSC #2 in  Zakopane
 Cancelled.
 February 1 & 2: SSC #3 in  Štrbské Pleso #2
 March 21: SSC #4 in  Kremnica-Skalka
 March 22: SSC #5 (final) in  Skalka nad Váhom

2019–20 FIS Cross-Country Skiing Far East Cup
 Note: For the FIS page about these events, click here.
 December 16 & 17, 2019: FEC #1 in  Alpensia Cross-Country and Biathlon Centre #1
 Men's 10 km Classic winner:  Mikhail Sosnin
 Women's 5 km Classic winner:  Anastasiya Dubova
 Men's 10 km Freestyle winner:  Mikhail Sosnin
 Women's 5 km Freestyle winner:  Anastasiya Dubova
 December 25 – 27, 2019: FEC #2 in  Otoineppu
 Men's 10 km Classic winner:  Naoto Baba
 Women's 5 km Classic winner:  Masako Ishida
 Men's 10 km Freestyle winner:  Naoto Baba
 Women's 5 km Freestyle winner:  Masako Ishida
 January 6 – 8: FEC #3, #4, & #5 in  Sapporo
 January 19 & 20: FEC #6 in  Alpensia Cross-Country and Biathlon Centre #2
 March 20 – 22: FEC #7 (final) in  Shiramine

2019–20 FIS Cross-Country Skiing Scandinavian Cup
 Note: For the FIS page about these events, click here.
 December 13 – 15, 2019: CCSC #1 in  Vuokatti
 1.2 km Classic winners:  Thomas Helland Larsen (m) /  Silje Øyre Slind (f)
 Men's 30 km Classic Mst winner:  Eirik Sverdrup Augdal
 Women's 20 km Classic Mst winner:  Maria Nordström
 Men's 15 km Freestyle winner:  Jan Thomas Jenssen
 Women's 10 km Freestyle winner:  Julie Myhre
 January 3 – 5: CCSC #2 in  Nes Skianlegg
 March 13 – 15: CCSC #3 (final) in  Otepää

2020 FIS Cross-Country Skiing Balkan Cup
 Note: For the FIS page about these events, click here.
 January 20 & 21: BC #1 in  Zlatibor
 January 25 & 26: BC #2 in  3-5 Pigadia Ski Resort
 February 1 & 2: BC #3 in  Ravna Gora
 February 25 & 26: BC #4 in  Mavrovo
 February 29 & March 1: BC #5 in  Dvorišta-Pale
 March 14 & 15: BC #6 (final) in  Bolu-Gerede

2019 FIS Cross-Country Skiing Australia & New Zealand Cup
 Note: For the FIS page about these events, click here.
 July 27 & 28: ANZC #1 in  Falls Creek
 Sprint Classical winners:  Phillip Bellingham (m) /  Katerina Paul (f)
 Freestyle winners:  Phillip Bellingham (m) /  Casey Wright (f)
 August 17 & 18: ANZC #2 in  Perisher Valley
 Sprint Freestyle winners:  Phillip Bellingham (m) /  Katerina Paul (f)
 Classical winners:  Phillip Bellingham (m) /  Casey Wright (f)
 September 3 – 5: ANZC #3 (final) in  Snow Farm
 Sprint Classical winners:  Hiroyuki Miyazawa (m) /  Jessie Diggins (f)
 Freestyle winners:  Tomoki Sato (m) /  Jessie Diggins (f)
 Classical Mass Start winners:  Hiroyuki Miyazawa (m) /  Jessie Diggins (f)

Freestyle skiing

2020 Winter Youth Olympics (Freestyle skiing)
 January 20 – 22: Freestyle skiing at the 2020 Winter Youth Olympics in  Leysin & Villars-sur-Ollon

2019–20 FIS Freestyle Ski World Cup (Moguls and Aerials)
 Note: For the FIS page about these events, click here.
 December 7, 2019: MAWC #1 in  Ruka
 Moguls winners:  Mikaël Kingsbury (m) /  Perrine Laffont (f)
 December 14 & 15, 2019: MAWC #2 in  Thaiwoo
 Moguls winners:  Ikuma Horishima (m) /  Perrine Laffont (f)
 Dual Moguls winners:  Mikaël Kingsbury (m) /  Perrine Laffont (f)
 December 21 & 22, 2019: MAWC #3 in  Shimao Lotus Mountain
 Aerials #1 winners:  Qi Guangpu (m) /  Xu Mengtao (f)
 Aerials #2 winners:  Qi Guangpu (m) /  Xu Mengtao (f)
 Aerials Team winners: 
 January 25: MAWC #4 in  Mont Tremblant Resort
 Moguls winners:  Mikaël Kingsbury (m) /  Perrine Laffont (f)
 January 31 & February 1: MAWC #5 in  Calgary
 Moguls winners:  Mikaël Kingsbury (m) /  Perrine Laffont (f)
 February 6 – 8: MAWC #6 in  Deer Valley
 February 15: MAWC #7 in  Tbilisi
 Event cancelled.
 February 15: MAWC #7 in  Moscow
 February 22: MAWC #8 in  Raubichi
 February 22 & 23: MAWC #9 in  Tazawako
 February 29 & March 1: MAWC #10 in  Almaty
 March 7 & 8: MAWC #11 in  Krasnoyarsk
 March 14 & 15: MAWC #12 (final) in   Idre Fjäll

2019–20 FIS Freestyle Skiing World Cup (Half-pipe, Big air, & Slopestyle)
 Note: For the FIS page about these events, click here.
 September 6 & 7, 2019: HB&SWC #1 in  Cardrona Alpine Resort
 Halfpipe winners:  Birk Irving (m) /  Zhang Kexin (f)
 November 3, 2019: HB&SWC #2 in  Modena SKIPASS
 Freeski Big Air winners:  Alex Hall (m) /  Mathilde Gremaud (f)
 November 21 – 23, 2019: HB&SWC #3 in  Stubai Alps
 Event cancelled.
 December 11 – 13, 2019: HB&SWC #4 in  Copper Mountain
 Halfpipe winners:  Aaron Blunck (m) /  Zoe Atkin (f)
 December 12 – 14, 2019: HB&SWC #5 in  Beijing
 Big Air winners:  Birk Ruud (m) /  Johanne Killi (f)
 December 19 – 21, 2019: HB&SWC #6 in  Genting Resort Secret Garden
 Halfpipe winners:  Noah Bowman (m) /  Valeriya Demidova (f)
 December 19 – 21, 2019: HB&SWC #7 in  Atlanta
 Big Air winners:  Alex Hall (m) /  Mathilde Gremaud (f)
 January 3: HB&SWC #8 in  Düsseldorf
 Event cancelled.
 January 9 – 11: HB&SWC #9 in  Font-Romeu
 Freeski Slopestyle winners:  Mark Hendrickson (m) /  Tess Ledeux (f)
 January 17 & 18: HB&SWC #10 in  Seiser Alm
 Freeski Slopestyle winners:  Birk Ruud (m) /  Caroline Claire (f)
 January 29 – February 1: HB&SWC #11 in  Mammoth Mountain Ski Area
 Freeski Slopestyle winners:  Andri Ragettli (m) /  Sarah Hoefflin (f)
 Halfpipe winners:  Aaron Blunk (m) /  Cassie Sharpe (f)
 February 12 – 15: HB&SWC #12 in  Calgary
 February 28 & 29: HB&SWC #13 in  Deštne
 March 19 – 21: HB&SWC #14 (final) in  Silvaplana

2019–20 FIS Freestyle Skiing World Cup (Ski cross)
 Note: For the FIS page about these events, click here.
 December 5 – 7, 2019: SCWC #1 in  Val Thorens
 Ski Cross #1 winners:  Kevin Drury (m) /  Sandra Näslund (f)
 Ski Cross #2 winners:  Kristofor Mahler (m) /  Fanny Smith (f)
 December 12 – 14, 2019: SCWC #2 in  Montafon
 Ski Cross winners:  Ryan Regez (m) /  Marielle Thompson (f)
 December 17, 2019: SCWC #3 in  Arosa
 Ski Cross winners:  Kevin Drury (m) /  Marielle Thompson (f)
 December 20 – 22, 2019: SCWC #4 in  Innichen
 Ski Cross #1 winners:  Kevin Drury (m) /  Marielle Berger Sabbatel (f)
 Ski Cross #2 winners:  Joos Berry (m) /  Fanny Smith (f)
 January 17 & 18: SCWC #5 in  Nakiska
 Ski Cross winners:  Reece Howden Drury (m) /  Sandra Näslund (f)
 January 24 – 26: SCWC #6 in   Idre Fjäll
 Ski Cross #1 winners:  Ryan Regez (m) /   Fanny Smith (f)
 Ski Cross #2 winners:  Daniel Bohnacker (m) /  Sandra Näslund (f)
 January 31 & February 1: SCWC #7 in  Megève
 Ski Cross winners:  Kevin Drury (m) /  Marielle Thompson (f)
 February 7 – 9: SCWC #8 in  Feldberg
 February 22 & 23: SCWC #9 in  Sunny Valley Ski Resort (Miass)
 February 28 – March 1: SCWC #10 in  Genting Resort Secret Garden
 March 14: SCWC #11 (final) in  Veysonnaz

2019–20 FIS Freestyle Skiing European Cup
 Note: For the FIS page about these events, click here.
 November 23 & 24, 2019: FSEC #1 in  Pitztal
 Ski Cross winners:  Tyler Wallasch (m) /  Marielle Thompson (f)
 November 29 & 30, 2019: FSEC #2 in  Ruka
 Aerials #1 winners:  Noé Roth (m) /  Laura Peel
 Aerials #2 winners:  Ilya Burov (m) /  Zhanbota Aldabergenova (f)
 December 18 – 20, 2019: FSEC #3 in  Val Thorens
 Ski Cross winners:  Frederic Berthold (m) /  Polina Ryabova (f)
 January 6 & 7: FSEC #4 in  Airolo
 January 10 & 11: FSEC #5 in  Prato (Leventina)
 January 24 & 25: FSEC #6 in  Lenk im Simmental
 January 28 & 29: FSEC #7 in  Châtel
 February 3 & 4: FSEC #8 in  Tignes
 February 7 & 8: FSEC #9 in  Dolní Morava
 February 7 – 9: FSEC #10 in  Raubichi
 February 8 & 9: FSEC #11 in  Åre
 February 14 & 15: FSEC #12 in  Jyväskylä
 February 15 & 16: FSEC #13 in  Grasgehren
 February 19 & 20: FSEC #14 in  Krasnoe Ozero
 February 25 & 26: FSEC #15 in  Taivalkoski
 March 21 & 22: FSEC #17 (final) in  Reiteralm

2019–20 FIS Freestyle Skiing Nor-Am Cup
 Note: For the FIS page about these events, click here.
 December 20 & 21, 2019: FSNA #1 in  Copper Mountain
 Halfpipe #1 winners:  Andrew Longino (m) /  Zoe Atkin (f)
 Halfpipe #2 winners:  Andrew Longino (m) /  Zoe Atkin (f)
 January 9 – 12: FSNA #2 in  Canyon Ski Area
 January 20 – 23: FSNA #3 in  Nakiska
 February 1 – 4: FSNA #4 in  Calabogie Peaks
 February 5 – 7: FSNA #5 in  Mammoth Mountain Ski Area
 February 9 – 13: FSNA #6 in  Deer Valley
 March 3 – 6: FSNA #7 (final) in  Woodward – Park City

2019 FIS Freestyle Skiing South American Cup
 Note: For the FIS page about these events, click here.
 August 2 – 4: SAC #1 in  La Parva #1
 Note: The women's slopestyle events were cancelled.
 Men's Slopestyle winners:  Benjamin Garces (#1) /  Luke Price (#2) 
 August 30 – September 1: SAC #2 in  La Parva #2
 Event cancelled.
 September 7 & 8: SAC #3 in  Cerro Catedral
 Note: The women's big air events were cancelled.
 Men's Big Air winner:  Nahuel Medrano (2 times)
 September 16 & 17: SAC #4 in  Pucón
 Men's Ski Cross winner:  Joaquin Valdes (2 times)
 Women's Ski Cross winner:  Antoinette Tansley (2 times)
 September 23 & 24: SAC #5 (final) in  Chapelco
 Slopestyle winners:  Mateo Bonacalza (m) /  Paloma Leyton (f)

2019 FIS Freestyle Skiing Australia & New Zealand Cup
 Note: For the FIS page about these events, click here.
 August 7 – 9: ANCFS #1 in  Perisher Ski Resort #1
 Note: The slopestyle events were cancelled.
 Men's Big Air winners:  Jackson Wells (#1) /  Ben Barclay (#2)
 Women's Big Air winners:  CHENG Jiahui (#1) /  YANG Shuorui (#2)
 August 14 – 17: ANCFS #2 in  Cardrona Alpine Resort #1
 Slopestyle winners:  Taisei Yamamoto (m) /  Eileen Gu (f)
 August 25 – September 2: ANCFS #3 in  Cardrona Alpine Resort #2
 Halfpipe winners:  Mao Bingqiang (m) /  Eileen Gu (f)
 Slopestyle winners:  Ben Barclay (m) /  Eileen Gu (f)
 August 27 & 28: ANCFS #4 in  Perisher Ski Resort #2
 Men's Moguls winners:  Ikuma Horishima (#1) /  Mikaël Kingsbury (#2)
 Women's Moguls winner:  Jakara Anthony (2 times)
 August 31: ANCFS #5 in  Mount Buller Alpine Resort
 Dual Moguls winners:  Brodie Summers (m) /  Rino Yanagimoto (f)
 September 2 – 8: ANCFS #6 in  Hotham Alpine Resort
 Men's Ski Cross winners:  Zach Belczyk (2 times; #1) /  Tyler Wallasch (#2) /  Brady Leman (#3)
 Women's Ski Cross winners:  Marielle Thompson (3 times; #1) /  Sami Kennedy-Sim (#2)
 October 2: ANCFS #7 (final) in  Cardrona Alpine Resort #3
 Halfpipe winners:  Toma Matsuura (m) /  Dillan Glennie (f)

Nordic combined

2020 Winter Youth Olympics (Nordic combined)
 January 18 – 22: Nordic combined at the 2020 Winter Youth Olympics in  Prémanon

International nordic combined event
 February 28 – March 8: Part of the 2020 Nordic Junior World Ski Championships in  Oberwiesenthal

2019–20 FIS Nordic Combined World Cup
 Note: For the FIS page about these events, click here.
 November 28 – December 1, 2019: NCWC #1 in  Ruka
 Men's individual winner #1:  Jarl Magnus Riiber (3 times)
 Overall winner:  Jarl Magnus Riiber
 December 6 – 8, 2019: NCWC #2 in  Lillehammer
 Winner #1:  Jarl Magnus Riiber (2 times)
 December 20 – 22, 2019: NCWC #3 in  Ramsau am Dachstein
 Winner #1:  Vinzenz Geiger
 Winner #2:  Jarl Magnus Riiber
 January 9 – 12: NCWC #4 in  Fiemme Valley
 January 24 – 26: NCWC #5 in  Oberstdorf
 January 30 – February 2: NCWC #6 in  Seefeld in Tirol
 February 7 – 9: NCWC #7 in  Otepää
 February 21 – 23: NCWC #8 in  Trondheim
 February 28 – March 1: NCWC #9 in  Lahti
 March 6 & 7: NCWC #10 in  Oslo
 March 13 – 15: NCWC #11 (final) in  Schonach im Schwarzwald

2019–20 FIS Nordic Combined Continental Cup
 Note: For the FIS page about these events, click here.
 December 12 – 15, 2019: CCNC #1 in  Utah Olympic Park
 Winners #1:  Jakub Lange (m) /  Tara Geraghty-Moats (f)
 Winners #2:  Jakub Lange (m) /  Tara Geraghty-Moats (f)
 Mass Start winners:  Jakub Lange (m) /  Tara Geraghty-Moats (f)
 December 19 & 20, 2019: CCNC #2 in  Oberwiesenthal
 Event Cancelled.
 January 17 – 19: CCNC #3 in  Klingenthal
 January 25 & 26: CCNC #4 in  Rena
 February 1 & 2: CCNC #5 in  Planica
 February 8 & 9: CCNC #6 in  Otepää
 February 14 – 16: CCNC #7 in  Eisenerz
 March 7 & 8: CCNC #8 in  Lahti
 March 13 – 15: CCNC #9 (final) in  Nizhny Tagil

2019–20 FIS Nordic Combined Alpen Cup
 Note: For the FIS page about these events, click here.
 August 5, 2019: ACNC #1 in  Klingenthal
 Women's individual winner:  Daniela Dejori
 August 9, 2019: ACNC #2 in  Bischofsgrün
 Women's individual winner:  Daniela Dejori
 September 14 & 15, 2019: ACNC #3 in  Winterberg
 Men's individual winner:  Stefan Rettenegger (2 times)
 September 21 & 22, 2019: ACNC #4 in  Predazzo-Fiemme Valley
 Men's individual winners:  Nick Siegemund (#1) /  Stefan Rettenegger (#2)
 Women's individual winner:  Lisa Hirner (2 times)
 December 21 & 22, 2019: ACNC #5 in  Seefeld in Tirol
 Men's individual winners:  Fabio Obermeyr (#1) /  Manuel Einkemmer (#2)
 Women's individual winners:  Annalena Slamik (#1) /  Lisa Hirner (f)
 January 11 & 12: ACNC #6 in  Schonach im Schwarzwald
 February 8 & 9: ACNC #7 in  Kranj
 February 22 & 23: ACNC #8 (final) in  Villach

2019 FIS Nordic Combined Grand Prix
 Note: For the FIS page about these events, click here.
 August 23 – 25: GPNC #1 in  Oberwiesenthal
 Individual winners:  Akito Watabe (m) /  Tara Geraghty-Moats (f)
 Team winners:  (Samuel Costa, Veronica Gianmoena, Annika Sieff, & Alessandro Pittin)
 August 27 & 28: GPNC #2 in  Klingenthal
 Men's Mass Start winner:  Franz-Josef Rehrl
 Women's individual winner:  Tara Geraghty-Moats
 August 30 – September 1: GPNC #3 in  Oberhof
 Men's individual winners:  Franz-Josef Rehrl (#1) /  Antoine Gérard (#2)
 Women's individual winners:  Tara Geraghty-Moats (#1) /  Gyda Westvold Hansen (#2)
 September 3 & 4: GPNC #4 in  Tschagguns
 Men's individual winner:  Fabian Rießle
 September 6 – 8: GPNC #5 (final) in  Planica
 Men's individual winner:  Jarl Magnus Riiber (2 times)

Ski jumping

2020 Winter Youth Olympics (Ski jumping)
 January 19 – 22: Ski jumping at the 2020 Winter Youth Olympics in  Prémanon

International ski jumping events
 February 28 – March 8: Part of the 2020 Nordic Junior World Ski Championships in  Oberwiesenthal
 March 20 – 22: FIS Ski Flying World Championships 2020 in  Planica

2019–20 Four Hills Tournament
 December 28 & 29, 2019: FHT #1 in  Oberstdorf
 December 31, 2019 & January 1: FHT #2 in  Garmisch-Partenkirchen
 January 3 & 4: FHT #3 in  Innsbruck
 January 5 & 6: FHT #4 (final) in  Bischofshofen

Raw Air 2020
 March 6 – 8: RA #1 in  Oslo (SJWC #21)
 March 9 & 10: RA #2 in  Lillehammer (SJWC #22)
 March 11 & 12: RA #3 in  Trondheim (SJWC #23)
 March 13 – 15: RA #4 (final) in  Vikersund (SJWC #24)

2019–20 FIS Ski Jumping World Cup
 Note: For the FIS page about these events, click here.
 November 2019
 November 22 – 24, 2019: SJWC #1 in  Wisła
 Winner:  Daniel-André Tande
 Team winners:  (Philipp Aschenwald, Daniel Huber, Jan Hörl, Stefan Kraft)
 November 29 – December 1, 2019: SJWC #2 in  Ruka
 Men's winners:  Daniel-André Tande (#1) / (2nd is cancelled)
 December 2019
 December 6 – 8, 2019: SJWC #3 in  Lillehammer
 Women's winners:  Maren Lundby (2 times)
 December 6 – 8, 2019: SJWC #4 in  Nizhny Tagil #1
 Men's winners:  Yukiya Satō (#1) /  Stefan Kraft (#2)
 December 13 – 15, 2019: SJWC #5 in  Klingenthal
 Winners:  Ryoyu Kobayashi (m) /  Chiara Hölzl (f)
 Men's Team winners:  (Piotr Żyła, Jakub Wolny, Kamil Stoch, Dawid Kubacki)
 December 20 – 22, 2019: SJWC #6 in  Engelberg
 Men's winners:  Kamil Stoch (#1) /  Ryoyu Kobayashi (#2)
 January 2020
 January 10 – 12: SJWC #7 in  Sapporo #1
 January 10 – 12: SJWC #8 in  Fiemme Valley
 January 16 – 19: SJWC #9 in  Zaō
 January 17 – 19: SJWC #10 in  Titisee-Neustadt
 January 24 – 26: SJWC #11 in  Râșnov #1
 January 24 – 26: SJWC #12 in  Zakopane
 January 31 – February 2: SJWC #13 in  Oberstdorf
 January 31 – February 2: SJWC #14 in  Sapporo #2
 February 2020
 February 7 – 9: SJWC #15 in  Hinzenbach
 February 7 – 9: SJWC #16 in  Willingen
 February 14 – 16: SJWC #17 in  Tauplitz-Bad Mitterndorf
 February 20 – 22: SJWC #18 in  Râșnov #2
 February 21 – 23: SJWC #19 in  Ljubno ob Savinji
 February 28 – March 1: SJWC #20 in  Lahti
 March 2020
 March 13 – 15: SJWC #25 in  Nizhny Tagil #2
 March 20 – 22: SJWC #26 in  Chaykovsky

2019–20 FIS Ski Jumping Continental Cup
 Note: For the FIS page about these events, click here.
 July 2019
 July 5 & 6, 2019: SJCC #1 in  Kranj
 Men's individual winner:  Evgeni Klimov (2 times) 
 July 13 & 14, 2019: SJCC #2 in  Shchuchinsk
 Men's individual winners:  Maximilian Lienher (#1) /  Keiichi Sato (#2)
 Women's individual winner:  Gyda Westvold Hansen (2 times)
 August 2019
 August 8 & 9, 2019: SJCC #3 in  Szczyrk
 Women's individual winner:  Marita Kramer (2 times)
 August 10 & 11, 2019: SJCC #4 in  Wisła
 Men's individual winner:  Klemens Murańka (2 times)
 August 16 & 17, 2019: SJCC #5 in  Frenštát pod Radhoštěm
 Men's individual winners:  Joakim Aune (#1) /  Pawel Wasek (#2)
 August 31 & September 1, 2019: SJCC #6 in  Râșnov
 Men's individual winner:  Rok Justin (2 times)
 September 2019
 September 14 & 15, 2019: SJCC #7 in  Lillehammer
 Note: The second women's individual event was cancelled.
 Men's individual winners:  Klemens Murańka (#1) /  Simon Ammann (#2)
 Women's individual winner:  Sara Takanashi
 September 21 & 22, 2019: SJCC #8 in  Stams
 Men's individual winner:  Taku Takeuchi (2 times)
 Women's individual winners:  Eva Pinkelnig (#1) /  Ema Klinec (#2)
 September 28 & 29, 2019: SJCC #9 in  Klingenthal #1
 Men's individual winner:  Domen Prevc (2 times)
 December 2019
 December 7 & 8, 2019: SJCC #10 in  Vikersund
 Men's individual winners:  Taku Takeuchi (#1) /  Anders Håre (#2)
 December 13 & 14, 2019: SJCC #11 in  Notodden
 Women's individual winners:  Jessica Malsiner (#1) /  Sophie Sorschag (#2)
 December 14 & 15, 2019: SJCC #12 in  Ruka
 Men's individual winners:  Keiichi Sato (#1) /  Taku Takeuchi (#2)
 December 27 & 28, 2019: SJCC #13 in  Engelberg
 January 2020
 January 3 & 4: SJCC #14 in  Titisee-Neustadt
 January 11 & 12: SJCC #15 in  Bischofshofen
 January 18 & 19: SJCC #16 in  Klingenthal #2
 January 25 & 26: SJCC #17 in  Sapporo-Okurayama Ski Jump Stadium
 January 25 & 26: SJCC #18 in  Rena #1
 February 2020
 February 1 & 2: SJCC #19 in  Planica
 February 8 & 9: SJCC #20 in  Brotterode
 February 14 – 16: SJCC #21 in  Iron Mountain
 February 22 & 23: SJCC #22 in  Fiemme Valley
 February 29 & March 1: SJCC #23 in  Rena #2
 March 2020
 March 7 & 8: SJCC #24 in  Lahti
 March 14 & 15: SJCC #25 in  Zakopane
 March 21 & 22: SJCC #26 (final) in  Chaykovsky

2019–20 FIS Ski Jumping Alpen Cup
 Note: For the FIS page about these events, click here.
 August 4 & 5, 2019: SJAC #1 in  Klingenthal
 Women's individual winners:  Nika Prevc (#1) /  Jenny Nowak (#2)
 August 7 & 8, 2019: SJAC #2 in  Pöhla
 Women's individual winner:  Jessica Malsiner (2 times)
 August 9 & 10, 2019: SJAC #3 in  Bischofsgrün
 Women's individual winners:  Vanessa Moharitsch (#1) /  Lia Boehme (#2)
 September 13 – 15, 2019: SJAC #4 in  Velenje
 Men's individual winner:  Marco Woergoetter (2 times)
 Women's individual winner:  Jerica Jesenko (2 times)
 Mixed Team winners:  (Lara Logar, Mark Hafnar, Pia Mazi, & Lovro Vodusek)
 September 20 – 22, 2019: SJAC #5 in  Predazzo-Fiemme Valley
 Men's individual winner:  Marco Woergoetter (2 times)
 Women's individual winners:  Lisa Hirner (#1) /  Jessica Malsiner (#2)
 December 20 – 22, 2019: SJAC #6 in  Seefeld in Tirol
 Men's individual winners:  Žak Mogel (#1) /  Marco Wörgötter (#2)
 Women's individual winner:  Lisa Eder (2 times)
 January 11 & 12: SJAC #7 in  Schonach im Schwarzwald
 February 7 & 8: SJAC #8 in  Kranj
 February 21 – 23: SJAC #9 (final) in  Villach

2019–20 FIS Ski Jumping Cup
 Note: For the FIS page about these events, click here.
 July 6 & 7, 2019: SJC #1 in  Szczyrk
 Men's individual winners:  Tim Fuchs (#1) /  Claudio Moerth (#2)
 Women's individual winner:  Špela Rogelj (2 times)
 July 11 & 12, 2019: SJC #2 in  Shchuchinsk
 Men's individual winner:  Maximilian Lienher (2 times)
 Women's individual winners:  Valentina Sderzhikova (#1) /  Irma Machinya (#2)
 August 3 & 4, 2019: SJC #3 in  Ljubno ob Savinji
 Men's individual winners:  Stefan Rainer (#1) /  Jernej Presecnik (#2)
 Women's individual winners:  Urša Bogataj (#1) /  Nika Križnar (#2)
 August 17 & 18, 2019: SJC #4 in  PyeongChang
 Men's individual winners:  Tim Fuchs (#1) /  Ren Nikaido (#2)
 August 24 & 25, 2019: SJC #5 in  Râșnov
 Men's individual winner:  Markus Rupitsch (2 times)
 Women's individual winner:  Daniela Haralambie (2 times)
 October 5 & 6, 2019: SJC #6 in  Villach #1
 Men's individual winners:  Christian Ingebrigtsen (#1) /  Matias Braathen (#2)
 Women's individual winner:  Agnes Reisch (2 times)
 December 13 & 14, 2019: SJC #7 in  Notodden
 Men's individual winners:  Stefan Rainer (#1) /  Fabian Seidl (#2)
 December 21 & 22, 2019: SJC #8 in  Oberwiesenthal
 Men's individual winners:  Danil Sadreev (#1) /  Tim Fuchs (#2)
 Women's individual winners:  Selina Freitag (#1) /  Kinga Rajda (#2)
 January 18 & 19: SJC #9 in  Zakopane
 January 25 & 26: SJC #10 in  Rastbüchl
 February 1 & 2: SJC #11 in  Liberec
 February 15 & 16: SJC #12 (final) in  Villach #2

2019 FIS Ski Jumping Grand Prix
 Note: For the FIS page about these events, click here.
 July 19 – 21: SJGP #1 in  Wisła
 Men's individual winner:  Timi Zajc
 Men's team winners:  (Piotr Żyła, Aleksander Zniszczoł, Kamil Stoch, & Dawid Kubacki)
 July 26 & 27: SJGP #2 in  Hinterzarten
 Individual winners:  Karl Geiger (m) /  Sara Takanashi (f)
 Mixed Team winners:  (Juliane Seyfarth, Karl Geiger, Agnes Reisch, & Richard Freitag)
 August 8 – 10: SJGP #3 in  Courchevel
 Individual winners:  Timi Zajc (m) /  Sara Takanashi (f)
 August 16 – 18: SJGP #4 in  Zakopane
 Men's individual winner:  Kamil Stoch
 Men's team winners:  (Naoki Nakamura, Keiichi Sato, Yukiya Satō, & Junshirō Kobayashi)
 August 17 & 18: SJGP #5 in  Frenštát pod Radhoštěm
 Women's individual winner:  Nika Križnar
 August 22 – 24: SJGP #6 in  Hakuba
 Men's individual winner:  Ryoyu Kobayashi (2 times)
 September 28 & 29: SJGP #7 in  Hinzenbach
 Men's individual winner:  Dawid Kubacki
 October 4 & 5: SJGP #8 (final) in  Klingenthal
 Men's individual winner:  Anže Lanišek

Ski mountaineering

2020 Winter Youth Olympics (Ski mountaineering)
 January 10 – 14: Ski mountaineering at the 2020 Winter Youth Olympics in  Villars-sur-Ollon

2019–20 ISMF World Cup
 December 20 & 21, 2019: ISMF #1 in  Aussois
 Individual Race Medium winner:  Axelle Mollaret
 Individual Race winner:  Robert Antonioli
 Sprint Race winners:  Iwan Arnold (m) /  Marianne Fatton (f)
 January 25 & 26: ISMF #2 in  La Massana
 February 8 & 9: ISMF #3 in  Berchtesgaden
 February 19 & 20: ISMF #4 in  Wanlong Resort (Zhangjiakou)
 April 2 – 5: ISMF #5 (final) in  Madonna di Campiglio

2020 ISMF Continental championships
 April 2 – 5: 2020 ISMF European Championships in  Madonna di Campiglio
 TBA: 2020 ISMF Asian-Pacific Championship (location TBA)
 TBA: 2020 ISMF North-American Championship (location TBA)

Snowboarding

2020 Winter Youth Olympics (Snowboarding)
 January 18 – 21: Snowboarding at the 2020 Winter Youth Olympics (Halfpipe & Slopestyle) in  Leysin
 January 20 & 21: Snowboarding at the 2020 Winter Youth Olympics (Snowboard Cross) in  Villars-sur-Ollon

2019–20 Alpine Snowboarding World Cup
 Note: For the FIS page about these events, click here.
 December 7 & 8, 2019: ASWC #1 in  Bannoye
 Parallel Slalom winners:  Andreas Prommegger (m) /  Julie Zogg (f)
 Parallel Giant Slalom winners:  Roland Fischnaller (m) /  Ramona Theresia Hofmeister (f)
 December 14, 2019: ASWC #2 in  Cortina d'Ampezzo
 Parallel Giant Slalom winners:  Roland Fischnaller (m) /  Ramona Theresia Hofmeister (f)
 December 19, 2019: ASWC #3 in  Carezza
 Event cancelled.
 January 4 & 5: ASWC #4 in  Lackenhof
 January 11: ASWC #5 in  Scuol
 January 14 & 15: ASWC #6 in  Bad Gastein
 January 18: ASWC #7 in  Rogla Ski Resort
 January 25 & 26: ASWC #8 in  Piancavallo
 February 22 & 23: ASWC #9 in  PyeongChang
 February 29 & March 1: ASWC #10 in  Blue Mountain
 March 14 & 15: ASWC #11 in  Winterberg

2019–20 Snowboard Cross World Cup
 Note: For the FIS page about these events, click here.
 December 12 – 14, 2019: SBXWC #1 in  Montafon
 Snowboard Cross winners:  Alessandro Hämmerle (m) /  Eva Samková (f)
 December 20 & 21, 2019: SBXWC #2 in  Breuil-Cervinia
 Snowboard Cross winners:  Lorenzo Sommariva (m) /  Michela Moioli (f)
 January 9 – 11: SBXWC #3 in  Bad Gastein
 January 24 – 26: SBXWC #4 in  Big White Ski Resort
 January 31 – February 2: SBXWC #5 in  Feldberg
 February 28 & 29: SBXWC #6 in  Genting Resort Secret Garden
 March 6 & 7: SBXWC #7 in  Sierra Nevada
 March 13 – 15: SBXWC #8 in  Veysonnaz

2019–20 Freestyle Snowboarding World Cup
 Note: For the FIS page about these events, click here.
 August 24 & 25, 2019: FSWC #1 in  Cardrona Alpine Resort
 Big Air winners:  Chris Corning (m) /  Enni Rukajärvi (f)
 November 2, 2019: FSWC #2 in  Modena Skipass
 Big Air winners:  Nicolas Laframboise (m) /  Reira Iwabuchi (f)
 December 12 – 14, 2019: FSWC #3 in  Copper Mountain
 Halfpipe winners:  Scotty James (f) /  Queralt Castellet (f)
 December 13 & 14, 2019: FSWC #4 in  Beijing
 Big Air winners:  Maxence Parrot (m) /  Miyabi Onitsuka (f)
 December 20 & 21, 2019: FSWC #5 in  Atlanta
 Big Air winners:  Chris Corning (m) /  Reira Iwabuchi (f)
 December 20 – 22, 2019: FSWC #6 in  Genting Resort Secret Garden
 Halfpipe winners:  Scotty James (f) / Liu Jiayu (f)
 January 4: FSWC #7 in  Düsseldorf
 Event cancelled.
 January 13 – 18: FSWC #8 in  Laax
 January 22 & 23: FSWC #9 in  Seiser Alm
 January 29 – February 1: FSWC #10 in  Mammoth Mountain
 February 13 – 16: FSWC #11 in  Calgary
 March 20 & 21: FSWC #12 in  Špindlerův Mlýn

2019–20 FIS Snowboard European Cup
 Note: For the FIS page about these events, click here.
 November 2019
 November 28, 2019: SBEC #1 in  Pitztal
 Cancelled
 January 2020
 January 11 & 12: SBEC #3 (location TBA)
 January 14 & 15: SBEC #4 in  Grasgehren
 Men's Snowboard Cross winners: (#1) / (#2)
 Women's Snowboard Cross winners: (#1) / (#2)
 February 2020
 February 1 & 2: SBEC #5 (location TBA)
 February 8 & 9: SBEC #6 in  Lenzerheide
 Men's Parallel Slalom winners: (#1) / (#2)
 Women's Parallel Slalom winners: (#1) / (#2)
 February 12 & 13: SBEC #7 (location TBA)
 February 15 & 16: SBEC #8 in  Simonhöhe
 Men's Parallel Giant Slalom winners: (#1) / (#2)
 Women's Parallel Giant Slalom winners: (#1) / (#2)
 March 2020
 March 7 & 8: SBEC #9 in  Tauplitz
 Men's Parallel Slalom winners: (#1) / (#2)
 Women's Parallel Slalom winners: (#1) / (#2)
 March 14 & 15: SBEC #10 in  Reiteralm
 Men's Snowboard Cross winners: (#1) / (#2)
 Women's Snowboard Cross winners: (#1) / (#2)
 March 20 & 21: SBEC #11 in  Lenk
 Men's Snowboard Cross winners: (#1) / (#2)
 Women's Snowboard Cross winners: (#1) / (#2)
 March 21 & 22: SBEC #12 in  Davos
 Parallel Slalom winners: (m) / (f)
 Parallel Giant Slalom winners: (m) / (f)

2019–20 FIS Snowboard Nor-Am Cup
 Note: For the FIS page about these events, click here.
 December 17 & 18, 2019: SNAC #1 in  Copper Mountain
 Halfpipe #1 winners:  Shuichiro Shigeno (m) /  Brooke D'Hondt (f)
 Halfpipe #2 winners:  Kaishu Hirano (m) /  Manon Kaji (f)
 January 14 – 16: SNAC #2 in  Sun Peaks Resort
 January 29 – 31: SNAC #3 in  Big White Ski Resort
 February 7 – 9: SNAC #4 in  Mammoth Mountain Ski Area
 February 18 – 20: SNAC #5 in  Maximise
 March 2 – 5: SNAC #6 in  Woodward – Park City
 March 11 – 13: SNAC #7 (final) in  Mont Orignal

2019 FIS Snowboard South American Cup
 Note: For the FIS page about these events, click here.
 August 2 – 4: SACSB #1 in  La Parva #1
 Men's Slopestyle winner:  Inaqui Irarrazaval (2 times)
 Women's Slopestyle winner:  Antonia Yanez (2 times)
 August 30 – September 1: SACSB #2 in  La Parva #2
 Event cancelled.
 September 3 – 5: SACSB #3 in  Pucón #1
 Snowboard Cross winners:  Steven Williams (m) /  Charlotte Bankes (f)
 Giant Slalom winners:  SHAO Yunyang (m) /  CUI Ming (f)
 September 7 & 8: SACSB #4 in  Cerro Catedral
 Men's Big Air winners:  Pedro Bidegain (#1) /  Matías Schmitt (#2)
 Women's Big Air winner:  Antonia Yanez (2 times)
 September 8 – 11: SACSB #5 in  Corralco Ski Resort
 Men's Snowboard Cross winner:  Steven Williams (2 times)
 Women's Snowboard Cross winner:  Karen Fujita (2 times)
 September 14 & 15: SACSB #6 in  Pucón #2
 Event cancelled.
 September 16 & 17: SACSB #7 in  Pucón #3
 Men's Snowboard Cross winner:  Diego Cerón (2 times)
 Women's Snowboard Cross winner:  Isabel Clark Ribeiro (2 times)
 September 23 & 24: SACSB #8 in  Chapelco
 Slopestyle winners:  Álvaro Yáñez (m) /  Terra Traub (f)
 September 28 & 29: SACSB #9 (final) in  Cerro Castor
 Men's Snowboard Cross winner:  Steven Williams (2 times)
 Women's Snowboard Cross winners:  FENG He (#1) /  Maria Augustina Pardo (#2)

2019 FIS Snowboard Australia & New Zealand Cup
 Note: For the FIS page about these events, click here.
 August 5 – 8: SBANC #1 in  Mount Hotham #1'
 Note: The second set of snowboard cross events for men & women were cancelled.
 Snowboard Cross winners:  Cameron Bolton (m) /  Christina Taylor (f)
 August 6 – 9: SBANC #2 in  Perisher
 Note: The slopestyle events were cancelled.
 Men's Big Air winners:  Valentino Guseli (#1) /  Daniel Alkefjaerd (#2)
 Women's Big Air winners:  Katie Ormerod (#1) /  Alexandra Chen (#2)
 August 14 – 17: SBANC #3 in  Cardrona #1
 Slopestyle winners:  SU Yiming (m) /  Rina Yoshika (f)
 August 25 – September 2: SBANC #4 in  Cardrona #2
 Halfpipe winners:  Zhang Yiwei (m) /  Cai Xuetong (f)
 Slopestyle winners:  Ryoma Kimata (m) /  Silje Norendal (f)
 September 2 – 4: SBANC #5 in  Mount Hotham #2
 Men's Snowboard Cross winner:  Yoshiki Takahara (2 times)
 Women's Snowboard Cross winners:  Belle Brockhoff (#1) /  Jana Fischer (#2)
 October 2: SBANC #6 (final) in  Cardrona #3
 Halfpipe winners:  WANG Ziyang (m) /  WU Shaotong (f)

Telemark skiing

Telemark Skiing World Junior Championships
 March 2 – 5: 2020 FIS Junior World Telemark Skiing Championships in  Gérardmer (Vosges)

2020 Telemark Skiing World Cup
 Note: For the FIS page about these events, click here.
 January 24 & 25: TSWC #1 in  Pralognan-la-Vanoise
 January 29 – February 1: TSWC #2 in  Samoëns
 February 8 & 9: TSWC #3 in  Krvavec Ski Resort
 February 15 & 16: TSWC #4 in  Bad Hindelang-Oberjoch
 March 15 & 16: TSWC #5 in  Mürren-Schilthorn
 March 19 – 21: TSWC #6 (final) in  Thyon 4 Valleys

References

Skiing
Skiing
Skiing
Skiing
Skiing by year